Jiang Wenwen is the name of:

Jiang Wenwen (synchronised swimmer) (born 1986), Chinese synchronised swimmer
Jiang Wenwen (cyclist) (born 1986), Chinese cyclist